Penicillium neocrassum is a terverticillate species of fungus in the genus Penicillium which was isolated from grapes.

References

neocrassum
Fungi described in 2007